Somdet Phra Ariyavangsagatayana Somdet Phra Sangharaja (known also as Ariyavangsagatayana II) was the 9th Supreme Patriarch of Thailand 1893–1899. He was born in 1812 in the Nonthaburi Province as Sa Pussadeva. Prior to becoming supreme patriarch, he was the abbot of Wat Ratchapradit. He succeeded Pavares Variyalongkorn as Patriarch in 1893. He died aged 87 years in 1899 and was succeeded by Vajirananavarorasa.

Supreme Patriarchs of Thailand
Thai Theravada Buddhist monks
1812 births
1899 deaths
People from Nonthaburi province